The Chief Minister of Tripura, an Indian state, is the head of the Government of Tripura. As per the Constitution of India, the Governor of Tripura is the state's de jure head, but de facto executive authority rests with the chief minister. Following elections to the Tripura Legislative Assembly, the governor usually invites the party (or coalition) with a majority of seats to form the government. The governor appoints the chief minister, whose council of ministers are collectively responsible to the assembly. Given that he has the confidence of the assembly, the chief minister's term is for five years and is subject to no term limits.

Since 1963, Tripura has had eleven chief ministers. The first was Sachindra Lal Singh of the Indian National Congress. Manik Sarkar of the Communist Party of India (Marxist) served as Chief Minister of Tripura from 1998 to 2018; his reign was the longest in the state's history. The incumbent is Manik Saha, who succeeded Biplab Kumar Deb both are from Bhartiya Janata Party.

Chief Ministers of Tripura

Notes

References

External links

 Indian states since 1947

 
Tripura
Chief Ministers